Robert Kerr (born 14 February 1940, Kensington, west London, England) is a comic musician who plays trumpet and cornet.  He was originally a member of the Bonzo Dog Doo-Dah Band and was persuaded by Geoff Stephens to join The New Vaudeville Band, before forming his own combo, Bob Kerr's Whoopee Band.  Kerr was a part of a reunited Bonzo Dog Doo-Dah Band line-up of surviving members, which toured in 2006 and 2008.

He and his son, Matt, also operate a t-shirt printing business. Kerr's musical career is described in David Christie's Doo Dah Diaries.

References

1940 births
Living people
English jazz horn players
English jazz trumpeters
British surrealist artists
Male trumpeters
English cornetists
People from Kensington
Bonzo Dog Doo-Dah Band members
The New Vaudeville Band members
21st-century trumpeters
21st-century British male musicians
British male jazz musicians